The Walloon Export and Foreign Investment Agency (AWEX) is a public interest organisation in charge of the promotion of foreign trade and the attraction of foreign investments for Wallonia in Belgium. It was created on 1 April 2004 as a merger of the Walloon Export Agency (AWEX) and the Office for foreign Investors (OFI).

Organisation
The Board of Directors of the Walloon Export and Foreign Investment Agency consists of representatives of the Walloon Government, the trade unions and employers associations.

Structure
The AWEX services are divided into:
 Headquarters in Brussels (AWEX) and Namur (OFI); 
 Seven regional centres, located in each Walloon province:
 Charleroi
 Eupen
 Libramont
 Liège
 Mons
 Namur
 Nivelles
 An international economic and commercial network

See also
 FIT
 Regional Investment Company of Wallonia
 Science and technology in Wallonia
 SOWALFIN

Sources
 AWEX
 Wallonia export
 AWEX

External links
 

Wallonia
Foreign trade of Belgium
Investment promotion agencies